The 2016 United States Olympic trials for track and field were held at Hayward Field in Eugene, Oregon. Organized by USA Track and Field, the ten-day competition lasted from July 1 to July 10 and served as the national championships in track and field for the United States.

The results of the event determined qualification for the American Olympic team at the 2016 Summer Olympics, to be held in Rio de Janeiro. Provided they had achieved the Olympic standard, the top three athletes gained a place on the Olympic team. If a leading athlete did not hold the standard, or if an athlete withdrew, then the next highest finishing athlete with the standard was selected instead.

The trials for the men's and women's marathon were held February 13 in Los Angeles and the trials for the men's 50 km race walk were held February 21 in Santee, California. The trials for the 20 km race walk were held on June 30 in Salem, Oregon in front of the state capitol.  Only the Olympic qualifiers from that race were invited to appear at Hayward Field.

Men's results
Key:

Track

Field

Notes
 None of John Nunn, Trevor Barron and Nick Christie, who finished in top 3 at the US Olympic trials, reached the 1:24:00 qualifying time in the 20 km walk.
 Landon did not achieve the 2.29 m qualifying standard. Ricky Robertson, who finished in a tie for sixth place, was the next highest placed athlete with a qualifying mark and received the third Olympic spot.
 Will Claye did not have the long jump Olympic qualifying standard of 8.15 m; he missed it by one centimeter in the qualifying round, and his best jumps in the final were wind-aided. Fourth-place finisher Marquis Dendy, who also jumped 8.42 m but lost to Claye on second-best jumps, was named to the Olympic team. Fifth-place finisher Mike Hartfield was the alternate and eventually replaced Dendy, who withdrew from the Olympics due to a leg injury.
 No Americans reached the 77.00 m qualifying distance in the hammer throw, but Winkler, Johnson and McCullough were all invited by the IAAF based on their top-32 world list position.
 Curtis Thompson and Riley Dolezal finished second and third at the US Olympic trials but did not achieve the standard.  Sam Crouser finished fourth, Sean Furey finished eleventh and both have the qualification standard from 2015.

Women's results
Key:
.

Track

Field

Notes
 Abbey D'Agostino, who placed fifth in the 5,000 meters in 15:14.04, was named to the Olympic team after both Molly Huddle, who won, and Emily Infeld, who placed fourth and was first in line to replace her, decided to only run the 10,000 meters at the Olympics.
 Hannah Carson placed second in the javelin throw, but did not have the Olympic qualifying standard of 62.00 m. Brittany Borman, who finished fourth at the Olympic trials, was the only other American with a qualifying mark (64.75 m in 2015) and received the third Olympic spot.

References

Results
2016 U.S. Olympic team trials – track & field – 6/30/2016 to 7/10/2016 Eugene, Oregon Results. Track & Field Results Reporting System (TFRRS).
Main website results page. USA Track & Field.

External links
 

USA Outdoor Track and Field Championships
US Olympic Trials
Track, Outdoor
2016 in sports in Oregon
United States Summer Olympics Trials
Sports in Eugene, Oregon
Track and field in Oregon